The Elephant Whisperer published in April 2009 by Pan Macmillan in London and in July 2009 by Thomas Dunne/St Martin's Press in New York, is the second book written by South African author and conservationist Lawrence Anthony along with journalist Graham Spence.

Overview
This bestselling book tells the story of a herd of wild African elephants on an African game reserve. The herd is destined to be shot for dangerous behaviour when Anthony intervenes to try to save their lives.

The Elephant Whisperer has been translated into French, German, Italian, Chinese, and Spanish and has been published by Reader's Digest in France, Finland, Holland, Slovenia, Canada, and Sweden.

Literary criticism

Reviews
The book has been reviewed several times by journals.<ref
   name=bent09></ref><ref
   name=Selwyn13></ref><ref
   name=Schaefer09></ref><ref
   name=Anonymous09></ref>

—Marc Bekoff, author of The Emotional Lives of Animals.

—Ralph Helfer, author of Modoc.

—Irene M. Pepperberg, author of Alex and Me.

References

External links
 of Lawrence Anthony

2009 non-fiction books
South African non-fiction books
Elephant conservation
Books about elephants
Macmillan Publishers books
Thomas Dunne Books books